Multiplexing and multiple access may refer to: 

 Multiplexing, a method by which multiple analog or digital signals are combined into one signal over a shared medium
 Multiple access, allows several terminals connected to the same transmission medium to transmit over a shared medium.